Aldwincle (sometimes Aldwinkle or Aldwinckle) is a village and civil parish in North Northamptonshire, with a population at the time of the 2011 census of 322. It stands by a bend in the River Nene,  to the north of Thrapston. The name of the village means "Ealda's nook".

Historic buildings
The ecclesiastical parishes of Aldwincle All Saints and Aldwincle St Peter merged in 1879. All Saints was declared redundant in 1971. Being also a designated Grade I listed building, it is cared for by the Churches Conservation Trust. Also listed Grade I are St Peter's Church, Lyveden New Bield (and gardens), and Lyveden Old Bield.

The small primary school, Aldwincle Trinity, opened in 1976.

The village rectory was the birthplace of the English poet John Dryden, the English historian Thomas Fuller, and the English Civil War figure Charles Fleetwood, as well as the home of poet Mary Rolls.

See also
All Saints Church, Aldwincle
Lyveden New Bield

References

External links

A series of high resolution photographs etc.
Illustrated walk to Wadenhoe and return

Villages in Northamptonshire
North Northamptonshire
Civil parishes in Northamptonshire